Joseph-Arthur Barrette (April 28, 1875 – April 27, 1952) was a Canadian politician, businessman, farmer and notary.

Born in Saint-Barthélemy, Quebec, Canada, Barrette was elected to the House of Commons of Canada as a Member of the historical Conservative Party in 1911 to represent the riding of Berthier. He ran for election again in 1930 for the riding of Berthier—Maskinongé and won. He previously lost in 1921, 1925 and 1926. He also lost the elections of 1935 and 1940.

External links
 

1875 births
1952 deaths
Conservative Party of Canada (1867–1942) MPs
Members of the House of Commons of Canada from Quebec
Quebec notaries
Place of death missing